Mika Noronen (born 17 June 1979) is a Finnish former professional ice hockey goaltender. He played 71 games n the National Hockey League (NHL) with the Buffalo Sabres and Vancouver Canucks between 2000 and 2006. The rest of his career, which lasted from 1997 to 2016, was mainly spent in Finland. Internationally Noronen played for the Finnish national team at the junior and senior level, including at the 2004 World Championships.

Playing career
Noronen was drafted by the Buffalo Sabres in the 1997 NHL Entry Draft 21st overall. In his native Finland, he played for Tappara and HPK in the SM-liiga. He also played for the Rochester Americans in the American Hockey League.

While with the Rochester Americans, he gained some notoriety in a 2002 game against the Syracuse Crunch. A Crunch forward fired a slap shot past Noronen which hit the cross bar and bounced away. However, the goal judge signaled it was a goal. Play was stopped and the goal was counted. Noronen proceeded to spray the contents of his water bottle on the glass and wipe it away, pretending to clean the glass for the goal judge.

At the trade deadline in the 2005–06 season, Noronen was traded to the Vancouver Canucks in exchange for a second-round pick in the 2006 NHL Entry Draft. On March 14, 2006, Noronen played his first game as a Vancouver Canuck, allowing five goals in a 5–0 loss to the Nashville Predators.

Noronen was the first Finnish goaltender to be credited with a goal in the National Hockey League, a rare feat in itself. He was also the first Buffalo Sabres goaltender to accomplish the feat when he was the last Buffalo player to touch the puck before it entered the opponent's empty net on a delayed penalty on February 14, 2004.

In August 2006, Noronen opted to sign with Russian Hockey Super League team AK Bars Kazan rather than serving as back up to Roberto Luongo, making Noronen an unrestricted free agent at the end of the season. Then he joined Torpedo Nizhny Novgorod in the RSL. In January 2009 Noronen joined Linköpings HC of Elitserien. Noronen returned to Finland for the 2009–10 season. He began the season by signing a short-term contract with JYP Jyväskylä. After the contract had expired, he signed a contract with HIFK Helsinki. He retired after the 2016 season.

Career statistics

Regular season and playoffs

International

Awards and honours

References

External links
 

1979 births
Living people
Ak Bars Kazan players
Buffalo Sabres draft picks
Buffalo Sabres players
Finnish expatriate ice hockey players in Russia
Finnish ice hockey goaltenders
HC Davos players
HPK players
Ice hockey people from Tampere
JYP Jyväskylä players
Kokkolan Hermes players
Lempäälän Kisa players
Linköping HC players
Lukko players
Malmö Redhawks players
EHC München players
National Hockey League first-round draft picks
National Hockey League goaltenders who have scored in a game
Rochester Americans players
Tappara players
Torpedo Nizhny Novgorod players
Vancouver Canucks players